Lasiona (Greek: Λασιώνα) is a former municipality in Elis, West Greece, Greece. Since the 2011 local government reform it is part of the municipality Archaia Olympia, of which it is a municipal unit. The municipal unit has an area of 119.528 km2. Its seat of administration was the village Antroni. Lasiona is situated in a mountainous area on the border with Achaea, 20 km north of Olympia, 27 km northeast of Pyrgos and 50 km south of Patras. The Greek National Road 33 (Patras - Tripoli) passes through the municipal unit.

Historical population

See also
List of settlements in Elis

References

External links